Cyclamen neapolitanum usually refers to Cyclamen hederifolium.

It may also refer to:
Cyclamen africanum
Cyclamen cyprium